Fenqihu or Fenchihu is a settlement in Zhuqi Township, Chiayi County, Taiwan. Fenqihu is a railway town on the Alishan Forest Railway and is known for their railway bento.

Etymology
The town used to be known as Pùn-ki-ôo in Taiwanese Hokkien, which literally means "dustpan lake". The name comes from how mountains surround the town on three sides. The character ôo refers to the basin that the town sits in; there is no lake at the town.

History 
People began settling in Fenqihu before the Alishan Forest Railway, but the town remained quite small. In 1912, the railway tracks were extended to Fenqihu. In the past, there was one train service in each direction each day; since Fenqihu was located roughly in the middle of the route, the two steam locomotives would both stop here around noon to add coal and water. Passengers were free to walk into the town, so locals began selling railway bento to these passengers to eat, and the town grew rapidly.

Architecture
Fenqihu Old Street is 500 meters in length with buildings along the street were built following the slope of the street which sits on a hill slope.

Transportation
The town is served by Fenqihu railway station of Alishan Forest Railway.

See also
 Alishan National Scenic Area

References

Geography of Chiayi County
Tourist attractions in Chiayi County